Spēlmaņu nakts gada aktieris is an annual award given to best stage actor in Latvia.

References

Latvian awards
Theatre in Latvia